State Road 166 in the U.S. State of Indiana is a short highway in southern Perry County.  Though it has an even number, in practice it is a north–south highway for most of its length.

Route description
State Road 166 begins at the banks of the Ohio River just south of the small town of Tobinsport.  Leaving the town, it heads straight north until the river bends to the west, at which point the road also bends to the west and hugs the banks of the river for a mile or so until it reaches State Road 66.

The highway is narrower than most state-maintained highways, and during times of high water levels on the Ohio River, it is often closed.  The road surface is rough and undulating in places, this being caused by it being submerged for a prolonged period of time during the 1997 Ohio River Flood.

History
Until sometime in the 1950s, Route 166 previously connected with Kentucky Route 105 via a ferryboat across the Ohio River to and from downtown Cloverport, in northwestern Breckinridge County, Kentucky. Ferry service was since discontinued.

Major intersections

References

External links

166
Transportation in Perry County, Indiana